Kaze-Forces for the Defense of Democracy (KAZE-FDD) is a small, predominantly ethnic Hutu political party in Burundi. It is led by Jean-Bosco Ndayikengurukiye.

Political parties in Burundi